Henry's mormyrid (Isichthys henryi) is a species of freshwater elephantfish in the family Mormyridae and the only member of its genus. It occurs in coastal river basins in West Africa, ranging as far southeast as the Kouilou-Niari River in Middle Africa.

References 

Weakly electric fish
Mormyridae
Monotypic ray-finned fish genera
Fish of Africa
Fish described in 1863